Iran participated in the 1966 Asian Games held in the capital city of Bangkok, and ranked 6th with 6 gold medals on this occasion of the Asiad.

Medal summary

Medal table

Medalists

Athletics

  Silver
 Ahmad Mirhosseini - Men's 3000 m steeplechase
 Jalal Keshmiri - Men's discus throw
  Bronze
 Teymour Ghiassi - Men's high jump
 Jalal Keshmiri - Men's shot put

Boxing

  Bronze 
 Nasser Aghaei - Men's 57 kg
 Eltefat Talebi - Men's 60 kg
 Aloush Abbasi - Men's 81 kg
 Hossein Fathianpour - Men's +81 kg

Cycling

Road
  Bronze 
 Team - Men's team time trial
 Team roster
 Hassan Roustaei
 Mehdi Doukchi
 Davoud Akhlaghi
 Esmaeil Hosseini

Track
  Bronze 
 Esmaeil Hosseini - Men's individual pursuit

Football

  Silver
 Team - Men
 Team roster
 Aziz Asli
 Faramarz Zelli
 Parviz Ghelichkhani
 Hassan Habibi
 Hamid Jasemian
 Goudarz Habibi
 Mohammad Ranjbar
 Jalal Talebi
 Mostafa Arab
 Hossein Farzami
 Ali Jabbari
 Hamid Aminikhah
 Akbar Eftekhari
 Abdollah Saedi
 Fariborz Esmaeili
 Hamid Shirzadeghan
 Homayoun Behzadi
 Parviz Mirzahassan
 Head coach: Gyorgy Szucs

Table tennis

  Bronze 
 Houshang Bozorgzadeh - Men's singles

Tennis

  Bronze 
 Taghi Akbari - Men's singles
 Team - Men's team
 Team roster
 Taghi Akbari
 Ezzatollah Nemati
 Nematollah Nemati
 Issa Khodaei

Volleyball

Indoor
  Bronze
 Team - Men
 Team roster
 Mahmoud Motlagh
 Hassan Kord
 Masoud Salehieh
 Khalil Paknazar
 Changiz Ansari
 Hassan Kabiri
 Mohammad Hemmatyar
 Mojtaba Mortazavi
 Head coach: Hossein Jabbarzadegan
 Team - Women
 Team roster
 Mari Tet
 Rouhi Pandnavaz
 Mehri Kharrazi
 Ozra Malek
 Mina Fathi
 Nasrin Shokoufi
 Leila Emami
 Pari Fardi
 Jaleh Seyed-Hadizadeh
 Head coach: Fereydoon Sharifzadeh

Weightlifting

  Gold
 Mohammad Nassiri - Men's 56 kg
 Parviz Jalayer - Men's 67.5 kg
 Manouchehr Boroumand - Men's +90 kg
  Bronze
 Mohammadreza Nasehi - Men's 52 kg
 Mohammad Ammi Tehrani - Men's 75 kg
 Naser Doroudian - Men's 90 kg
 Reza Esteki - Men's +90 kg

Wrestling

Freestyle
  Gold
 Abdollah Movahed - Men's 70 kg
 Mansour Mehdizadeh - Men's 97 kg
 Eskandar Filabi - Men's +97 kg
  Silver
 Ali Akbar Heidari - Men's 52 kg
 Mohammad Ali Farrokhian - Men's 57 kg
 Mohammad Ebrahim Seifpour - Men's 63 kg
 Hossein Tahami - Men's 78 kg
 Mahmoud Moezzipour - Men's 87 kg

References

  Iran Olympic Committee - Asian Games Medalists
  Iran National Sports Organization - Asian Games Medalists

Nations at the 1966 Asian Games
1966
Asian Games